Trovinger Mill, also known as Rohrer's Mill, is a historic grist mill located in Hagerstown, Washington County, Maryland, United States. It was constructed in 1771 of roughly coursed local fieldstone. It is five bays in length with the mill race running underneath it about midway along its broad side. Nearby is the site of a newer mill, which is said to date later than the grain mill. Also present are the abutments of a bridge which crossed the Antietam at the mill as part of an 18th-century road leading from Hagerstown to the Old Forge about one and a half miles upstream. The structure contains much of the original woodwork as well as a significant part of the milling machinery.

It was listed on the National Register of Historic Places in 1975.

References

External links

, including photo from 1973, at Maryland Historical Trust

Industrial buildings completed in 1771
Buildings and structures in Hagerstown, Maryland
Grinding mills in Maryland
National Register of Historic Places in Washington County, Maryland
Grinding mills on the National Register of Historic Places in Maryland